The discography of Latin-American heavy metal band Ill Niño consists of seven studio albums, one compilation album, one video album, three extended plays and nineteen singles. The band was founded in New Jersey sometime in 1998.

Albums

Studio albums

Compilation albums

Video albums

Extended plays

Singles

Other appearances

References

External links
 Official website
 Ill Niño at AllMusic
 Ill Niño at Myspace
 

Heavy metal group discographies
Discographies of American artists